The Greek Orthodox Metropolis of Pittsburgh is an ecclesiastical territory or metropolis of the Greek Orthodox Church in the Ohio River Valley of the United States, encompassing the state of West Virginia, and the majority of the states of Ohio and Pennsylvania, except for the Greater Philadelphia area and the Western part of Ohio.

Part of the Greek Orthodox Archdiocese of America, it is led by a metropolitan bishop who serves as the priest of the mother church, St. Nicholas Cathedral in the City of Pittsburgh. 

Metropolitan Savas was enthroned as the Greek Orthodox Metropolitan Bishop of Pittsburgh on December 8, 2011, following his election to that post by the Holy Synod of the Ecumenical Patriarchate in Phanar, Constantinople, Turkey.

Bishops/Metropolitans of Pittsburgh
1979-2011    -  Maximos (Aghiorgoussis)
2011–Present -  Savas (Zembillas)

Byzantine choir
In 2008, the Byzantine choir of the Greek Orthodox Metropolis of Pittsburgh traveled to Naples, Florida, where it performed in concert at the Oratory of Ave Maria University.

References

External links
 Official biography of Metropolitan Savas from the Greek Orthodox Metropolis of Pittsburgh
 Story from the Pittsburgh Post-Gazette concerning Metropolitan Savas' enthronement as Metropolitan of Pittsburgh
 News release from the Greek Orthodox Archdiocese of America concerning Metropolitan Maximos' retirement
 Story from the Pittsburgh Post-Gazette concerning Metropolitan Maximos' retirement.
 Greek Orthodox Archdiocese of America 2007 Yearbook

Greek-American culture in Pennsylvania
Religion in Pittsburgh
Eastern Orthodoxy in Pennsylvania
Dioceses of the Greek Orthodox Archdiocese of America